Rudolf Schirmer (10 March 1831, Greifswald – 27 January 1896) was a German ophthalmologist from Greifswald.

He initially studied medicine at the University of Greifswald, then furthered his studies at Göttingen, Berlin, Paris and Vienna. Later he returned to Greifswald, where he was habilitated for ophthalmology in 1860. In 1873 he attained the chair of ophthalmology, a position he held until his retirement in 1893. In 1885, he succeeded philosopher Wilhelm Schuppe as university rector at Greifswald.

Schirmer is remembered for establishing ophthalmology as an independent discipline at Greifswald, as well as his research involving the anomalies of refraction and accommodation of the eye. Also he performed extensive studies of diseases involving the lacrimal apparatus. The term "Schirmer's syndrome" is employed to   indicate the association of hydrophthalmia (early glaucoma) and Sturge–Weber syndrome.

His son, Otto Schirmer (1864–1918) was also a professor of ophthalmology at Greifswald.

Publications 
 Ein Fall von Telangiektasia. Albrecht von Graefe's Archiv für Ophtalmologie, 1860, 7: 119–121. -  A case of telangiectasia.
 Die Lehre von den Refractions- und Accomodationsstörungen des Auges. Berlin, 1866. Die Krankheiten der Thränenorgane. Graefe-Saemisch, Handbuch der Augenheilkunde. - The theory of refraction and accommodation disorders of the eye.

References

External links
 XVth Convention of the Julius-Hirschberg-Gesellschaft (biography)
 Journal of the American Academy of Pediatrics Cerebral Perfusion Abnormalities in Children With Sturge-Weber Syndrome
 

1831 births
1896 deaths
People from Greifswald
German ophthalmologists
University of Greifswald alumni
Academic staff of the University of Greifswald
People from the Province of Pomerania